Hedotettix brachynota is an insect found in China, belonging to the Tetrigidae family.

See also
Hedotettix grossivalva
Hedotettix xueshanensis

References

Insects described in 2006
Insects of China
Tetrigidae